Meringden   is a Gaupalika (Nepali: गाउपालिका ; gaupalika) (Formerly: village development committee) located in Taplejung District in the Mechi Zone of eastern Nepal. The local body was formed by merging five VDCs Thinglabu, Santhakra, Khamlung, Lingtep,Thukima,Nalbu. Currently, it has a total of 6 wards. The population of the rural municipality is 12,548 according to the data collected on 2017 Nepalese local elections.

Gallery

Population 
As per 2017, Meringden hosts a population of 12,548 across a total area of 210 km2.

See also
Taplejung District

References

Rural municipalities in Koshi Province
Rural municipalities in Taplejung District
Rural municipalities of Nepal established in 2017